The Canton of Lamentin is a canton in the Arrondissement of Basse-Terre on the island of Guadeloupe. Its population was 16,573 in 2017.

Municipalities
The canton includes 1 commune:
 Lamentin

See also
 Cantons of Guadeloupe
 Communes of Guadeloupe
 Arrondissements of Guadeloupe

References

Cantons of Guadeloupe